Aaron Carpenter (born 9 January 1983) is a retired Canadian rugby union player.

Carpenter has represented Canada at three Rugby World Cups, in 2007, 2011 and 2015. Carpenter became the international cap leader for Canada on June 17, 2017 with a record 77 caps. After announcing his retirement from rugby in January 2018 he took up a role coaching with the Toronto Arrows.

References

External links
 Rugby Canada: RWC 2007 Player Profiles
 Rugby Canada: Carpenter From Back to Front
 Cornish Pirates Player Profile

1983 births
Living people
Canadian rugby union coaches
Canadian rugby union players
McMaster University alumni
Rugby football people from Ontario
Sportspeople from Brantford
Canada international rugby union players
Plymouth Albion R.F.C. players
Canadian expatriate rugby union players
Expatriate rugby union players in England
Canadian expatriate sportspeople in England
Rugby union flankers
Rugby union number eights
Rugby union hookers